

Aegean Oil S.A. is a Greek oil company that was founded by Dimitris Melissanidis in 1999. The company started by acquiring the Greek oil company EVROIL in Alexandroupoli and focused on expanding in northern Greece. Within two years, Aegean Oil had opened 150 gas stations in the region. Over the years, the company continued to grow and eventually acquired Texaco's fuel and lubricant facilities in Athens. Today, Aegean Oil has over 700 gas stations across Greece and is considered one of the top companies in the Greek petroleum market. 

In addition to its gas stations, Aegean Oil also supplies marine fuels and lubricants in Greece's largest ports. The company has been in the shipping industry since 1990 and is the largest natural supplier of marine fuels and lubricants in Greece. Aegean Oil is fully certified by Lloyd's Register and supplies ships at competitive prices. The company also has privately owned facilities in the area of Aspropyrgos with quality control laboratories.

See also
 Energy in Greece

References

External links

Oil and gas companies of Greece
Greek brands